The 1975 NCAA Division I baseball season, play of college baseball in the United States organized by the National Collegiate Athletic Association (NCAA) began in the spring of 1975.  The season progressed through the regular season and concluded with the 1975 College World Series.  The College World Series, held for the twenty ninth time in 1975, consisted of one team from each of eight regional competitions and was held in Omaha, Nebraska at Johnny Rosenblatt Stadium as a double-elimination tournament.  Texas claimed the championship for the third time.

Conference winners
This is a partial list of conference champions from the 1975 season.  For the first time, the NCAA sponsored regional competitions to determine the College World Series participants.  Eight regionals of four teams each competed in double-elimination tournaments, with the winners advancing to Omaha.  15 teams earned automatic bids by winning their conference championship while 17 teams earned at-large selections.

Conference standings
The following is an incomplete list of conference standings:

College World Series

The 1975 season marked the twenty ninth NCAA Baseball Tournament, which culminated with the eight team College World Series.  The College World Series was held in Omaha, Nebraska.  The eight teams played a double-elimination format, with Texas claiming their third championship with a 5–1 win over South Carolina in the final.

Award winners

All-America team

References